The Tensleep Sandstone is a geological formation of Pennsylvanian to very early Permian age in Wyoming.

The formation is composed of fine- to medium-grained sandstone, light gray and yellowish gray; generally slightly to moderately calcareous; some dolomite and sandy dolomite beds; mostly thick to massive sets of low-angle, wedge-planar crossbeds of dunes. Forms cliffs 61-91m (200-300 feet) thick.

Trace fossils 

In 1932 Edward Branson and Maurice Mehl reported the discovery of a fossil trackway in the formation. A new ichnospecies, Steganoposaurus belli, was erected for these footprints. The tracks were probably made by a web-footed animal slightly less than three feet long.  This creature was originally presumed to be an amphibian, but the toe prints it left behind were pointed like a reptile's rather than round like an amphibians. The actual trackmaker may have been similar to the genus Hylonomus. The ichnogenus Tridentichnus are similar footprints preserved in the Supai Formation of Arizona.

References

Bibliography 
 Lockley, Martin  and Hunt, Adrian.  Dinosaur Tracks of Western North America. Columbia University Press. 1999.

Geologic formations of Wyoming
Carboniferous System of North America
Pennsylvanian Series
Cisuralian Series of North America
Sandstone formations of the United States
Ichnofossiliferous formations